Balkan jazz is an umbrella term for jazz from different parts of the Balkan peninsula in southeastern Europe. Jazz in the region may incorporate various types of Balkan music, especially folk musics (including "gypsy style"). It has embraced improvisation and originality, much like jazz traditions in the Americas and elsewhere. Characteristic features can include use of unusual meters ("odd rhythms"), sometimes played very fast. There are many venues for Balkan jazz, which is also frequently played at weddings and big celebrations. The clarinet is often a key instrument in keeping with folk music traditions, and the accordion, drum, bass and electric guitar are also widely used. 

References

See also
Ethno jazz
Gypsy jazz
Klezmer
Music of Albania
Music of Bosnia and Herzegovina
Music of Greece
Music of Montenegro
Music of North Macedonia
Music of Thrace
Romani music

Jazz genres
Balkan music